OGLE2-TR-L9 is a magnitude 15 star  in the constellation Carina at a distance of approximately 5,142 light years.

Planetary system
This star is home to the transiting extrasolar planet OGLE2-TR-L9b discovered in 2008.

See also
 List of extrasolar planets
 Optical Gravitational Lensing Experiment OGLE

References

External links
 

F-type main-sequence stars
Planetary transit variables
Carina (constellation)
Planetary systems with one confirmed planet